The following is a list of the television and radio networks and announcers that have broadcast NBA Finals games in the United States and Canada over the years.

In addition to the English-language broadcasts, the NBA Finals also have Spanish-language broadcasts since 2002.

Television

2020s

Notes
2020: Due to the COVID-19 pandemic, the NBA postponed its regular season from March 11 to July 29, resuming with the seeding games for the 22 contending teams. Consequently, the 2020 Finals were played inside a bubble at the ESPN Wide World of Sports Complex in Bay Lake, Florida from September 30 to October 11, the latest date to end an NBA season. The Finals between the Los Angeles Lakers and the Miami Heat was the lowest-rated NBA Finals ever (4.0 rating over six games).
2021: Rachel Nichols was originally assigned to work as a sideline reporter, but was replaced by Malika Andrews after a private video leaked of Nichols uttering insensitive racial comments towards African American ESPN personality Maria Taylor. Both Nichols and Taylor eventually left ESPN, with Taylor heading to NBC Sports after a contract dispute, and Nichols agreeing to a buyout after she was taken off of ESPN programming and had her show, The Jump, canceled due to this incident.
2022: ESPN2 will televise NBA Finals: Celebrating 75, a special alternate presentation for Game 1 which air Thursday at 9 PM ET from Seaport District studios in New York. Several guests will included Magic Johnson and Julius Erving. Mike Breen and Jeff Van Gundy missed Game 1 due to COVID-19 protocols, and Mark Jones filled in for Breen. Jones, Mark Jackson and Lisa Salters made history in Game 1 as the first all-African American broadcast team to cover an NBA Finals game. Breen also missed Game 2, whereas Van Gundy returned.

2010s

Notes
Per the current broadcast agreements, the Finals will be broadcast by ABC through 2025.
For the 2019 Finals (the first to feature the Toronto Raptors), TSN and Sportsnet, the main Canadian rightsholders of both the NBA and the Raptors, were permitted to broadcast distinct Canadian telecasts, in addition to the ABC telecast being simulcast on their co-owned broadcast networks. Telecasts on both TSN and Sportsnet use a common technical crew employed by Raptors team owner Maple Leaf Sports & Entertainment.

2000s

Notes
Although the 2007 NBA Finals aired on ABC (as had been the case since 2003), they were the first to carry the "ESPN on ABC" branding instead of the ABC Sports branding.
2007: The Finals between the San Antonio Spurs and the Cleveland Cavaliers was the lowest rated NBA Finals until 2020 (6.2 percent rating over four games).
Since 2007, NBA ratings have steadily risen, thanks to the resurgence of nationally recognized NBA teams, their star power, and their annual presence in the NBA Finals. Game 7 of the 2010 NBA Finals had the best rating for a basketball game in the contemporary NBA on ABC era, and the 2011 Finals held steady in the ratings department as well. Both series drew over a 10 rating, beating the World Series in consecutive years for the first time ever.
2006: Lisa Salters was the main sideline reporter alongside Stuart Scott with Michele Tafoya on maternity leave. She was the main ABC sideline reporter for that season before sliding back to secondary reporter with Tafoya's return.
2003: The series between the San Antonio Spurs and the New Jersey Nets was the lowest rated NBA Final (6.5 percent over six games) until 2007. This was also the only year that ABC broadcast both the NBA and the Stanley Cup Finals that involved teams from one city in the same year, as both the New Jersey Nets and the New Jersey Devils were in their respective league's finals. During ABC's broadcast of Game 3 between the San Antonio Spurs and the Nets in New Jersey on June 8, Brad Nessler, Tom Tolbert, and Bill Walton said that ABC was in a unique situation getting ready for both that game and Game 7 of the Stanley Cup Finals between the Devils and the Mighty Ducks of Anaheim the following night, also at Continental Airlines Arena. Gary Thorne, Bill Clement, and John Davidson mentioned this the following night and thanked Nessler, Tolbert, and Walton for promoting ABC's broadcast of Game 7 of the Stanley Cup Finals.
During the 2002 NBA Finals, Ahmad Rashad had told The Los Angeles Times before the 2002 NBA Finals began that he would be ending his 20-year run on NBC Sports with Game 3 of the NBA Finals on the pregame show. A feature in which he interviewed Shaquille O'Neal and Kobe Bryant would be his last assignment for the network. He and Hannah Storm were replaced by Bob Costas as host of the pregame show for the Finals, and Rashad declined to join Hannah Storm on the post-game show carried by CNBC.
2001: NBC studio host Hannah Storm did not anchor the NBA Finals due to her being on maternity leave, so Ahmad Rashad replaced her. She returned to cover the NBA Finals in 2002, but as postgame host.

1990s

Notes
The retirement of Michael Jordan set in motion the decline in NBA ratings which continued for several years. Ratings for the 1999 NBA Finals (which in fairness, came after a lockout shortened season) were down significantly from the previous year, from an 18.7 to an 11.3. Primetime regular season games, which had become fairly routine (and highly rated) during the Jordan years, set record lows for NBC once Jordan retired. With the rise of the Los Angeles Lakers in the early part of the 2000s (decade), ratings improved, but never to the level of the 1980s or 1990s. The highest NBA Finals ratings on NBC after Jordan left was the 2001 Finals, which featured the dominant and then-defending champion Lakers with Shaquille O'Neal and Kobe Bryant versus the polarizing Allen Iverson and the underdog Philadelphia 76ers. The ratings for that series were a 12.1, still down 35 percent from 1998. NBC's last Finals, in 2002, came after a resurgence in playoff ratings (including a 14.2 rating for Game 7 of the Western Conference Finals). However, the Finals itself registered the lowest ratings the event had seen since 1981, topping out at a 10.2 average.
1998: The Finals between the Chicago Bulls and the Utah Jazz was the highest rated NBA Finals ever (18.7 percent rating over six games). Game 6 registered a 22.3 Nielsen rating with a 38 share and attracted 72 million viewers and became the highest rated game in the history of the NBA. The previous record was a 21.2 rating and 37 share for Game 7 of the 1988 NBA Finals between the Los Angeles Lakers and Detroit Pistons.
During the 1997 NBA Finals, Hannah Storm became the first woman to serve as pre-game host of the NBA Finals after serving as a sideline reporter for NBC in the past four years, but she wasn't the first female broadcaster to cover the NBA Finals (that honor goes to Lesley Visser).
1994: During Game 5 (June 17, 1994) most NBC affiliates (except for the network's New York and Los Angeles owned-and-operated stations (the latter of which did not carry most of the game), along with its Houston affiliate) split-screened coverage of the game with NFL Hall of Famer O. J. Simpson's low speed freeway chase with the LAPD.
1993: Magic Johnson was unavailable for NBC's coverage of Game 6 (the series clincher) because he was attending his brother Larry's wedding.
1992: Magic Johnson helped call Games 1, 4, and 5 for NBC.
Once Larry Bird and Magic Johnson retired, the NBA's ratings sank, at least for one year. The 1990 NBA Finals, (which was played before either Bird or Johnson retired) which registered a 12.3 rating (and was the last Finals CBS aired) was the lone NBA Finals between the domination of Bird and Magic and the domination of then up-and-coming star Michael Jordan. In 1991, NBC's first year with the NBA, the network got its dream matchup. Jordan's Bulls finally broke through, after several years of being dominated by the Pistons, and made it to the Finals. Jordan and the Bulls played Magic Johnson and the Lakers, who were making what was to be their last appearance in the NBA Finals for the next nine years. The hype for the star-studded series was robust, and the ratings were the highest since 1987, when the Celtics and Lakers played for the final time. The next year, Jordan's Bulls once again made the Finals. Their competition that year was the Portland Trail Blazers, a team with fewer stars and from a smaller city. The ratings fell to a 14.2, the second-lowest rating for the Finals since 1986. In 1993, the NBA hit a high point. The six-game series between the Bulls and the bombastic Charles Barkley's Phoenix Suns averaged a 17.9 rating, a mark that eclipsed the previous record of 15.9.
The 1993 Finals were Jordan's last before his first retirement. The Houston Rockets would take the next two titles consecutively. The ratings for those next two Finals decreased, but still had above-average views, and the 1995 Finals even came to within .3 ratings points of the 1992 Finals and featured Superstar Shaquille O'Neal making the Finals with the Orlando Magic, which were swept 4–0 by the Rockets. After the two seasons, Jordan returned. Subsequently, and almost instantly, ratings greatly increased. Jordan's first game back, a March 19, 1995 game between the Bulls and the Indiana Pacers, scored a 10.9 rating for NBC, the highest rated regular-season NBA game of all time. Ratings for the Finals (which the Bulls played in the following three years) went up sharply as well. Game 1 of the 1996 NBA Finals between the Bulls and Seattle SuperSonics, the Bulls' 107–90 win at home in the United Center earned a 16.8 rating and a 31 share on NBC. In addition, Game 1 was viewed in a then record 16,111,200 homes. On June 16, 1996, Game 6 of the NBA Finals (where the Bulls clinched their fourth NBA Championship in six years) drew an 18.8 rating and a 35 share. The six games of the 1996 NBA Finals averaged a 16.7 rating which ranks second all-time behind the 1993 NBA Finals. The six games of the 1993 NBA Finals between the Bulls and Suns averaged a 17.9 rating. The next year, ratings for the Bulls–Utah Jazz series were slightly better, before the 1998 Finals blew away the 1993 record, averaging an 18.7 rating—one which will likely not be matched by the NBA Finals for the foreseeable future. The deciding Game 6 (and Michael Jordan's final game with the Bulls) registered an NBA record 22.3 rating with a 38 share. The game was viewed by 72 million people, breaking the record set earlier that postseason by Game 7 of the 1998 Eastern Conference Finals between the Pacers and Bulls (that same game set a record for highest-rated non-Finals NBA game with a 19.1/33). The 1998 Finals managed to best the ratings for that year's World Series, the first of only three NBA Finals ever to do so.
Game 1 of the 1991 Finals, played on Sunday afternoon (June 2), was the last time an NBA Finals game was played as a matinee. Since then, weekend games of the Finals (as well as midweek games) have been played in the evening to accommodate prime-time television.

1980s

Notes
1989: Pat O'Brien was the pre-game and halftime host for Game 2 because Brent Musburger was on assignment (Musburger was covering the College World Series for CBS). This was also in the case in 1988. This was Musburger's last NBA Finals assignment for CBS, as he was fired on April 1, 1990, months before NBA's television contract with CBS expired.
In 1988, CBS achieved its only 20+ rating for an individual NBA game when the network got a 21.2 rating for Game 7 of the 1988 NBA Finals between the Lakers and Detroit Pistons. The Pistons would be in the next two NBA Finals, including a sweep the next year, and the lowest ratings CBS had seen in six years the year after that, with a 12.3 in 1990.
1987: James Brown was the sideline reporter for Games 3 and 4 (the latter being the Magic junior skyhook game) because Pat O'Brien attended the birth of son Sean Patrick. O'Brien called Games 1, 2, 5 and 6.
In 1987, the NBA Finals hit a then-record rating of 15.9.  The 1990 NBA Finals was CBS' last, after nearly two decades televising the NBA. While the network broadcast every Bird-Magic Finals, it never broadcast any Final involving Michael Jordan, who, starting the year after CBS ended involvement with the league, would dominate the NBA in a way that neither Bird or Magic had. In 1990, the final year of the CBS deal, the regular season rating stood at a 5.2. (Each rating point represents 931,000 households.)
Game 3 of the 1986 NBA Finals in Houston was played during the midst of an electrical storm that knocked the picture out for the approximately, the first six minutes of the fourth quarter. Although the video was already on the fritz towards the end of the third, CBS announcer Dick Stockton waited for nearly three minutes before adjusting to a radio play-by-play.
1984: The 1984 championship series was the most watched in NBA history, with soaring TV ratings.
Lesley Visser (the then wife of Dick Stockton) became the first woman to cover the NBA Finals.
1983: CBS joined Game 1 in progress with 7:37 left in the first period (meaning, there was no standard pregame coverage). Following the introduction montage (which was notable as it marked premiere of the intercutting, Bill Feigenbaum created CGI rendering of Boston Garden, used by CBS through the start of the 1989 Finals) with narration by anchor Brent Musburger, things were quickly passed off to play-by-play man Dick Stockton.
1982: The '82 Finals marked the first time since 1978 that all games aired live in its entirely; As a compromise between CBS and the NBA, the season returned to late October after starting it in early October the previous two seasons, meaning that the championship series started after the conclusion of May sweeps. Also, Brent Musburger served as anchor for Game 1 in Philadelphia, but had to anchor Games 2 and 3 from New York, because he hosted CBS Sports Sunday. So anchoring the coverage in Musburger's absence were Frank Glieber (Games 2–4) and Pat O'Brien (Game 5).
From 1979–1981, CBS aired weekday NBA Finals games on tape delay if they were not played on the West Coast. Games were televised after the late local news (11:30 pm) in the CBS Late Movie time slot. In some cases, games were seen live in the cities whose local NBA teams were playing. In 1981 for example, WNAC-TV Boston and KHOU-TV Houston carried Games 1, 2, 5 and 6 live, although most viewers around the country had to wait until after the late local news to see them.
1980 NBA Finals: The series-deciding Game 6 became the most notorious example of CBS's practice of showing even the most important NBA games on "tape delay" broadcasts. Because May 16, 1980 was a Friday, the network did not want to preempt two of its highest-rated shows, The Dukes of Hazzard and Dallas, even though both shows were already in reruns: the 1979–80 TV season had ended early, back in March, in anticipation of a strike that summer by the Screen Actors Guild. So Game 6 was shown at 11:30 pm Eastern (10:30 pm Central) in all but four US cities: Los Angeles, Philadelphia, Portland and Seattle, who carried it live. The game was not broadcast at all in Atlanta. (This is often cited as an example of TV's lack of interest in the NBA in the "pre-Magic and Bird" era.)
On a side note, here, in Game 4 of the 1980 Finals, Julius Erving executed the legendary Baseline Move, an incredible, behind-the-board reverse layup that seemed to defy gravity. Play-by-play announcer Brent Musburger has noted that Erving made such moves almost routinely in his ABA days—but the ABA had no national TV contract in those days. This Game 4 move, played to a national audience in a title game, has probably become Julius Erving's most famous move.
1981: The series between the Boston Celtics and the Houston Rockets was the lowest rated NBA Finals in history (6.7 rating over six games), until the 2003 NBA Finals drew only 6.5 percent of American television households. Four games of the 1981 series (Games 1, 2, 5 and the climatic Game 6) were telecast on tape delay outside of Boston and Houston.
As previously mentioned, before 2003, the 1981 NBA Finals received the lowest television rating in NBA history. The 1981 Finals drew a 6.7 rating, according to Nielsen Media Research. Meanwhile, the 2003 Finals between the San Antonio Spurs and New Jersey Nets drew a 6.5 rating. Due to this, the 1981 Finals were the last to be broadcast on tape-delay, with weeknight games airing after the late local news in most cities. Games 3 and 4 were played back-to-back on Saturday and Sunday, May 9 and 10, to give CBS two live Finals games. Following the Finals, Gary Bender was relegated to tertiary play-by-play for the rest of his tenure in CBS, while Rick Barry's contract, following his questionable racial comments about Bill Russell during the Finals, was not renewed. Russell would remain the main color commentator for the next two years alongside newly promoted main play-by-play commentator Dick Stockton. Curiously, Barry and Russell would reunite, this time on the NBA on TBS during the mid-1980s. Russell was replaced as CBS' lead analyst following the 1983 Finals by former Celtics teammate Tom Heinsohn.

1970s

Notes
1977: The post-game trophy presentation following Game 6 was never aired because CBS decided to air the Kemper Open following the game. Initially CBS wanted a 10:30 am. PT start to accommodate the golf tournament but the NBA refused, instead settling for the 12:00 pm. PT start time.
1976: There were three days of rest between Game 1 Sunday, May 23 and Game 2 Thursday, May 27, so that CBS would not have to count an NBA game in the Nielsen ratings for the May sweeps period. The 1976 May sweeps period ended Wednesday, May 26.
Game 3 tipped off at 10:30 am. MST to allow CBS to cover The Memorial golf tournament following the game. Church attendance that Sunday was sharply lower across Arizona, drawing an angry response from many clergy throughout the state.
CBS play-by-play announcer Brent Musburger, in a Fall 2009 interview with ESPN, said that he and color announcer Rick Barry were rooting for Phoenix to win Games 3, 4, and 6, although Barry's Golden State Warriors were eliminated by the Suns in the Western Conference Finals.  Musburger said that this was because he and Barry were paid by the game.  Since the Series was 2–0 Boston after the first two games, Musburger and Barry wanted the Suns to win the next two games to tie the series (likewise with Game 6).  Boston fans, unaware of Musburger's and Barry's motivations, were upset with the announcing crew because of their apparent favoritism.
1970: The first NBA Finals to be nationally televised in full.
ABC's coverage of Game 7 was blacked out on WABC-TV in the New York area. Play-by-play man Chris Schenkel made an announcement during the broadcast that the game would be rebroadcast in New York at 11:30 p.m. ET. The game was shown live on the MSG Network in New York City, which was then only available in about 25,000 cable households in Manhattan.

Surviving broadcasts
1970: Lakers–Knicks – Game 7 is intact.
1973: Knicks–Lakers – Games 1–4 is missing, but Game 5 was found and shown as a special on the MSG network in 2013.

1960s

Notes
1969 – Game 7 was televised by ABC in prime time.
In Game 4 of the 1965 Finals, the Boston Celtics beat the Los Angeles Lakers 112 to 99. In the closing minutes of the game, ABC cut away to a previously scheduled program. This event was likened to NBC cutting away from the World Series with the home team ahead 10 runs in the ninth inning.
For the majority of the 1960s, ABC only televised Sunday afternoon games, including the playoffs. ABC did not have to televise the deciding game if it occurred on a weeknight.
For the  season, SNI did two games. The first one being the All-Star Game at Los Angeles with Chick Hearn and Bud Blattner on the call.  The second game was the sixth and deciding game of the NBA Finals between the Boston Celtics and Los Angeles Lakers with Bob Wolff on the call.
1962 – All of the games from Boston were televised in Los Angeles on Channel 9 (then called KHJ-TV) with Chick Hearn on play-by-play. For Game 7, Jack Drees joined the broadcast team. In addition, Chick Hearn indicated that Game 7 was being syndicated around the nation to a variety of cities. The game was broadcast in Boston by WHDH-TV, but the station originated its own broadcast with Don Gillis as the commentator.

Surviving broadcasts

1969: Celtics–Lakers – only the entire 4th quarter of Game 7 exist.
1963: Celtics–Lakers – The deciding Game 6 exists as video, and has been aired on NBA TV's Hardwood Classics .

1950s

Radio

2020s

2010s

2000s

1990s

1980s

1970s

References

External links
5 HIGHLY IMPROBABLE FACTS ABOUT THE HISTORY OF THE NBA ON TV
Episode List: NBA Finals - TV Tango

Finals broadcasters
Finals broadcasters
Finals broadcasters
ABC Sports
CBS Sports
Basketball on NBC
Hughes Television Network
ESPN Radio
ESPN announcers
ABC Radio Sports